Social Theory and Practice is a peer-reviewed academic journal that features discussion of theoretical and applied questions in social, political, legal, economic, educational, and moral philosophy, including critical studies of classical and contemporary social philosophers. Established in 1970, it publishes original philosophical work by authors from many disciplines, including the humanities, the social sciences, and the natural sciences. This journal has a Level 1 classification from the Publication Forum of the Federation of Finnish Learned Societies. and a SHERPA/RoMEO "green" self-archiving policy. It is published quarterly by the Florida State University Department of Philosophy, in cooperation with the Philosophy Documentation Center.

Abstracting and indexing 
Social Theory and Practice is abstracted and indexed by:

See also 
 List of philosophy journals
 List of political science journals

References

External links
 

English-language journals
Social philosophy journals
Publications established in 1970
Quarterly journals
Political science journals
Philosophy Documentation Center academic journals